The Independent Schools Council (ISC) is a non-profit lobby group that represents over 1,300 private schools in the United Kingdom. The organisation comprises seven independent school associations and promotes the business interests of its independent school members in the political arena, which includes the Department for Education and has been described as the "sleepless champion of the sector."

History 
The ISC was first established (then as the Independent Schools Joint Council) in 1974 by the leaders of the associations that make up the independent schools. In 1998, it reconstituted as the Independent Schools Council.

Schools that are members of the associations that constitute ISC are inspected by the Independent Schools Inspectorate (ISI). Since December 2003, ISI has been the body approved by the Secretary of State for Education and Skills for the inspection of ISC schools and reports to the DfE under the 2002 Education Act. ISI was part of ISC until, in late 2007, the ISI became its own limited company, thereby separating itself from ISC.

The current chairman of ISC is Barnaby Lenon.  ISC is managed by the Chief Executive, Julie Robinson.

Partnerships with state schools 
Figures from the 2019 ISC Annual Census show 11,466 partnerships were recorded in that year.

The types of partnerships vary from academy sponsorship to seconding teaching staff, serving as governors at state schools and sharing facilities to partnering for activities and 5,000 projects.

The ISC has published an annual report of cross-sector partnership work between independent and state schools called Celebrating Partnerships.

Operation 
ISC has five principal activities:
 Provide authoritative research and intelligence about the sector
 Provide legal and regulatory information/guidance
 Provide online access and support informing parental decisions
 Promote the sector through lobbying and communications
 Provide a meeting place in central London for members

Current priorities include the following activities:
 To represent the views of our member associations in the National education debate
 To champion and channel sector consensus on public examinations and national curriculum frameworks
 To protect and promote the sector’s interests on charitable status, public benefit and social mobility
 To promote the sector’s view on a proportionate regulatory and inspection regime
 To promote the sector’s view on the proper regulatory framework for all aspects of safeguarding
 To protect and promote the sector’s interests in recruiting overseas pupils
 To support schools offering early years education
 To carry out annual data gathering and analysis on the sector via the Census
 To analyse the sector’s performance in national exams and university offers and admissions
 To carry out surveys on attitudes towards the sector and financial benchmarking
 To provide support for our expert groups
 To promote and coordinate the views of the sector, the associations and their members through the media
 To ensure consistent media responses across the sector
 To provide a high quality daily news service to all schools
 To support the marketing and promotion of schools, including user friendly access to information about schools
 To promote and catalogue independent-state school partnerships and provide an analysis of what works best
 To detail training opportunities for unqualified teachers in ISC schools
 To encourage good graduates to work in independent schools
 To counter misconceptions about independent schools
 To provide guidance and support for members and schools on all of the above

Judicial review of the Charity Commission, 2011 
In 2011, the ISC challenged the Charity Commission in relation to the latter's statutory guidance on public benefit.  The Upper Tribunal heard the judicial review, which was combined with an Attorney General's reference, over five days in May 2011 and reserved judgment until October 2011.  The lengthy ruling upheld ISC's main ground of complaint, which was that the guidance did not reflect the true state of charity law on public benefit and charities which charge fees. A subsequent hearing and ruling in December 2011 ordered that the Commission withdraw large parts of its guidance or face a quashing order.  The disputed guidance was withdrawn shortly before Christmas 2011, and replacement guidance was put out to consultation in 2012.

Constituent associations
 Girls' Schools Association (GSA) – the main association to which heads of girls' senior independent schools belong.
 Headmasters' and Headmistresses' Conference (HMC) – represents the heads of 298 boys' and co-educational independent senior schools.
 Society of Heads (SoH) – represents the heads of independent schools of all sizes, many of which have a long tradition of boarding.
 Independent Association of Prep Schools (IAPS) – represents the heads of more than 670 boys', girls' and mixed preparatory schools for children mainly between the ages of 7 and 13. Many IAPS schools take children from age 3, however, and some schools go up to the age of 16.
 Independent Schools Association (ISA) – ISA members include heads of nearly 600 schools for children of all ages. They represent both boarding and day schools, co-educational and single gender, and specialist schools in the arts and music.
 Association of Governing Bodies of Independent Schools (AGBIS) – represents the interests of the governing bodies of schools whose heads belong to GSA, HMC and SoH (and some belonging to IAPS & ISA).
 Independent Schools' Bursars Association (ISBA) – represents the bursars of over 800 senior and junior schools.

References

External links
 The Work of Ofsted - Children, Schools and Families Committee – Memorandum submitted to the House of Commons in May 2008

1974 establishments in the United Kingdom
1974 in education
Education in the City of Westminster
Education in the United Kingdom
Organisations based in the City of Westminster
Organizations established in 1974
Private school organisations in the United Kingdom